Cameron David Goodhue (born 24 January 1987) is a New Zealand rugby union player for London Welsh. He previously played for Northland and the Blues.
He weighs 110 kg and stands at  6 ft 3in
He plays as a number eight or flanker.

In June 2013, Goodhue signed for Worcester Warriors. After one season, he was signed by newly promoted side London Welsh from the 2014–15 season.

External links
Worcester Warriors profile
London Welsh profile

References

1987 births
Living people
Worcester Warriors players
Northland rugby union players
Blues (Super Rugby) players
Rugby union players from Auckland
Rugby union flankers
New Zealand rugby union players
New Zealand expatriate rugby union players
New Zealand expatriate sportspeople in England
Expatriate rugby union players in England